Fernex may refer to:

People
 Joseph Fernex (died 1795), French revolutionary judge
 Michel Fernex (1929–2021), Swiss doctor
 Solange Fernex (1934–2006), French politician

Places
 Fernex or Ferney, France